Scuderia Playteam (also known as Scuderia Playteam Sarafree) was an Italian racing team owned by Giambattista Giannoccaro.

History
The team competed in several series. These included the FIA GT Championship in 2007 when the team finished 2nd overall using a Maserati MC12. This entitled them to enter the 2008 24 Hours of Le Mans but the team did not do so.

In the 2008 Superleague Formula season they operated the A.C. Milan and Galatasaray S.K. teams.  They gained 8 podiums overall, and ex Formula One driver Robert Doornbos won 2 races. They did not return for the 2009 Superleague Formula season.

Drivers

Drivers who made at least one race start for Scuderia Playteam include:
 Andrea Bertolini
 Andrea Piccini
 Alessandro Pier Guidi
 Fabrizio de Simone
 Giambattista Giannoccaro
 Max Busnelli
 Alex Müller
 Yves Lambert
 Andrea Montermini
 Toni Vilander
 Robert Doornbos

Results

Superleague Formula

References

External links
 

Italian auto racing teams
Auto racing teams established in 2003
2003 establishments in Italy
FIA GT Championship teams
Superleague Formula teams
International GT Open teams